Koppe is a surname. Notable people with this surname include:

 Erwin Koppe (born 1938), German gymnast
 Hans-Peter Koppe (born 1958), German rower
 Joe Koppe (1930–2006), American baseball player
 Johann Benjamin Koppe (1750–1791), German Lutheran theologian
 Louise Koppe (1846–1900), French feminist writer and journalist, and founder of France's first maternity home
 Nancy J. Koppe, American magistrate judge
 Richard Koppe (1916–1973), American artist
 Wilhelm Koppe (1896–1975), German Nazi commander

See also
 George Cuppy (born George Maceo Koppe; 1869–1922), American professional baseball pitcher
 Kopp (surname)
 Koppes surname